The Crush Tour is a third concert video by American band Bon Jovi from the European leg of their Crush Tour. It was recorded on August 30, 2000 at Zurich, Switzerland. It was directed by Anthony Bongiovi. It was released on DVD in 2001.

Track listing

DVD Bonus Features
Backstage with Bon Jovi
It's My Life (Music Video)
Say It Isn't So (Music Video)
Photo Gallery
Discography

Personnel
Jon Bon Jovi - lead vocals, guitar
Richie Sambora - guitar, backing vocals, talkbox
Hugh McDonald - bass, backing vocals
Tico Torres - drums, percussion
David Bryan - keyboards, backing vocals

Certifications

References

2000 video albums
Bon Jovi video albums
Live video albums
2000 live albums